Algeria played a key role in Bangladesh's induction into the Organization of the Islamic Conference following the latter's independence from Pakistan in 1971.

Bangladesh has an embassy in Algiers, whilst Algeria has a non resident ambassador in Islamabad, Pakistan.
Algerian President Houari Boumediene traveled to Bangladesh to take Sheikh Mujibur Rahman on a special plane to the Islamic Summit in Lahore in 1974.

History
Algeria is part of the Maghreb region. The 14th century traveller, Ibn Battuta, mentioned in his book of the presence of Maghrebis in Bengal during this time, mostly as merchants. He speaks of a certain Muhammad al-Masmudi, who lived there with his wife and servant.

Modern
Algeria recognized Bangladesh soon after the latter's independence in December 1971. Relations further improved when Sheikh Mujibur Rahman became the first Bangladeshi head of state to visit Algiers in 1973 as part of a summit of the Non-Aligned Movement. In 1974 Algerian president Houari Boumediene paid an official visit to Dhaka. Algeria played a lead role in encouraging Bangladesh to join the Organization of the Islamic Conference in 1974. Algeria reopened its embassy in Dhaka on 29 January 2020, after closing it in 1990.

Economic cooperation
Bangladesh and Algeria have shown interest in expanding the bilateral economic activities between the two countries. Bangladeshi pharmaceuticals, melamine and leather goods have been identified as products with good potential in Algerian market. In 2007, a 20-member Bangladeshi business delegation along with chefs toured Algeria to find ways for increasing bilateral trade and investment between the two countries and to promote traditional Bangladeshi cuisine.

Algerian Embassy 
The Algerian embassy is located in Dhaka.

 Ambassador Rabah Larbi

Bangladeshi Embassy 
The Bangladeshi embassy is located in Algiers.

 Ambassador Muhammad Zulqar nain

References

 
Bilateral relations of Bangladesh
Bangladesh